Stenolophus lineola is a species of ground beetle in the family Carabidae. It is found in North America.

References

Further reading

External links

 

Stenolophus
Articles created by Qbugbot
Beetles described in 1775
Taxa named by Johan Christian Fabricius